Shinkan (神官) was a government official in Japan, who worked at a shakaku ranked Shinto shrine, and had been appointed an official position. Commonly, shinkan were officially appointed kannushi.

Terminology 
According to the 1884 Daijō-kan decree, shinkan is an officer who has been given the status of a government official (kanri) to serve at a shrine. However, in 1887, at shrines ranking below kanpei-sha, with the exception of Ise Grand Shrine, the position of shinkan was abolished and the position of shinshoku was introduced. In 1945, Ise Grand Shrine abolished the position of shinkan.

Today, the position of shinkan does not exist, and the kannushi of Shinto shrines are collectively referred to as shinshoku.

See also 

 Kannushi
 Modern system of ranked Shinto shrines
 Clergy

References 

Shinto shrines in Japan
Japanese Shintoists